Jason Philip Crump (born 6 August 1975) is a former international motorcycle speedway rider from Australia. He is a three-time Speedway World Champion, a World Cup winner and a former World Under-21 Champion.

In a 21-year career in Speedway, Jason Crump finished with 7 World Championship titles to his name (4 individual including the U/21 title, and 3 teams), making him one of the most successful Australian motorcycle racers of all time (including road racing, speedway and motocross). He holds the all-time record for Grand Prix wins with 23.

Family
His father, Phil Crump, is an Australian from the country town of Mildura and was riding for the Newport Wasps when Jason was born in Bristol, England. Phil, a four time Australian Solo Champion (1975, 1979, 1984 and 1988) and 13 time Victorian State Champion, finished third in the world championship in 1976 at the Silesian Stadium in Katowice (Poland) when British star Peter Collins won the title, and as part of the Australian team had won the 1976 Speedway World Team Cup Final at the White City Stadium in London. The Crump family had a home in Bristol while Phil was racing in the British League. Jason's maternal grandfather Neil Street was a former speedway rider and former long time manager of the Australian speedway team.

He and his wife have two children.

Career summary
After finishing second in both 1988 and 1989, Crump won his first major junior speedway title in 1990 becoming Australian Under-16 champion at the Bibra Lake Speedway in Perth, Western Australia (Crump defeated future Australian champion and teammate Ryan Sullivan for the title), and he progressed through the ranks.

His best placing in the Australian Under-21 Championship was third in 1992 at the Riverview Speedway in Murray Bridge (South Australia) behind reigning Australian U/21 and senior champion Leigh Adams and second placed Jason Hawkes, making it an all-Mildura podium. Crump didn't place in the 1993 Australian U/21 Championship at his then home track, Olympic Park, and like a number of young Aussie riders was denied the chance to win the title when it was not contested in 1994 or 1995. By the title resumed in 1996, Crump had turned 22 and the Aussie U/21 title would be one that got away in his career.

Just two weeks following his 19th birthday, Crump rode in his first World Final (1994) held at the Speedway Center in Vojens, Denmark, where he finished in 11th place with six points scored. After winning his opening ride, he failed to score in his next two races before finishing with a third and second placing. 1994 was notable as it was the last year the World Championship was decided in the traditional single meeting format that had been in place since the inaugural Final was held at the Wembley Stadium in 1936 which was won by Australia's Lionel Van Praag. From 1995 the World Championship would be decided by the new Speedway Grand Prix series.

1995 saw Crump join his father Phil as an Australian Champion when he won his first title at the Gosford Speedway, with the pair being the first (and only) father-son combination to win the title. Later that same year he made his Speedway Grand Prix debut as a wild card in the Speedway Grand Prix of Great Britain at the Hackney Wick Stadium in London – he won his first three rides, but fell in the B final to finish 8th overall.

1995 also saw Crump win his first World Championship when he won the Under-21 World Final at the Ratinan Stadion in Tampere, Finland after defeating Swede Daniel Andersson in a runoff when both riders finished on 13 points. His previous U/21 World Finals had seen him as a reserve rider in the Czech Republic in 1993 (he did not get to ride), while he had finished third in 1994 in Norway. Crump became Australia's 3rd Under-21 World Champion following on from Adelaide rider Steve Baker (1983) and close friend from Mildura Leigh Adams who won the title in 1992.

His first Grand Prix victory came in 1996, again riding at the British Grand Prix at Hackney Wick, although this time as a full-time Grand Prix rider. He has won the World Team Cup in 1999 in Pardubice and the new Speedway World Cup on two further occasions with the Australian team in 2001 in Wrocław, Poland and 2002 in Peterborough, England. In the 2001 World Cup, Crump became the first rider since the legendary Swede Ove Fundin in the inaugural Speedway World Team Cup in 1960 to go through the entire tournament (including qualification rounds) undefeated. Like their Australian Championship record as the only father and son to win the title, Jason Crump joined his dad as a World Team Cup winner by winning the 1999 Final in Pardubice in the Czech Republic.

Crump's first world title came in 2004 when he beat then 5-time champion Tony Rickardsson, having won two of the nine Grand Prix that season. He dominated the 2006 season winning four out of nine Grand Prix to take the title for the second time, beating American Greg Hancock into second place.

By winning the 2004 Speedway Grand Prix, Crump became Australia's first Individual World Champion since Jack Young had won his second successive World title in 1952. He also became only the fourth Australian rider to win the World Championship, joining Lionel Van Praag (1936), Arthur "Bluey" Wilkinson (1938) and Jack Young (1951 and 1952).

By becoming World Champion in 2004, Crump also became just the third rider after Sweden's Per Jonsson (1985 and 1990) and England's Gary Havelock (1987 and 1992) as riders to win both the Under-21 and Open Individual World Championships. He also became the first (and as of 2016 the only) rider to win the Individual Under-21, Individual Open and Team World Championships.

Crump began his European league career at the Poole Pirates in 1991, where his grandfather, Neil Street, was team manager. Crump won the 'treble' riding for the Peterborough Panthers in Britain during the 1999 season, winning the Elite League, the Knockout Cup and the Craven Shield.

He rode for the Belle Vue Aces for five seasons until the end of 2006 when, in 2007, Crump signed for the Poole Pirates in the Elite League.

At the end of the 2007 season, Poole announced that Crump would be leaving the club due to the large points limit reduction made by the British Speedway Promoters' Association (BSPA) at their 2007 annual general meeting,

Crump returned to Belle Vue for 2008 and signed a two-year deal to stay with the club. However, in October 2008, Crump announced he will not be riding in the British Elite League in 2009 in order to reduce his fixture schedule, allowing him to concentrate on the Grand Prix series.

He returned to Belle Vue in August 2009 to assist with their relegation fight and KO Cup campaign. On 14 September 2009, Crump fell during a last heat decider for Belle Vue against Ipswich, sustaining injuries to his left arm and shoulder. In spite of this he finally won his third world title in 2009.

He announced his retirement from Grand Prix racing at the end of the 2012 season on 24 September 2012. In December 2012 he confirmed that he was retiring from the sport altogether due to a back injury. However, eight years after he announced his retirement, Crump returned to the sport. He joined Ipswich Witches for the SGB Premiership 2020 season.

Crump rode again for Ipswich in the SGB Premiership 2021 and the Plymouth Gladiators in the SGB Championship 2021 but finally retired for good in 2022 to take a team management role at the newly reformed Oxford Cheetahs.

In Australia
Jason Crump was also successful when riding at home in Australia. He won the Australian Under-16 Championship in 1990 and won the Australian Championship in 1995 and 2007, the second of those while the reigning World Champion - only the second time since the national championship was first run in 1926 that a reigning World Champion had won the Australian Championship (the other being Ole Olsen's controversial win over Jason's dad Phil - the defending champion - in 1976). He also finished on the podium of the Australian Championship in 1994 (3rd), 1996 (2nd), 1997 (2nd), 1998 (3rd) and 2002 (2nd). Crump, after moving his home base from Mildura to Queensland in the mid-1990s, won the Queensland State Championship on five occasions (1995, 1997, 1998, 2001 and 2004). In 2002 Crump finished 3rd in the Speedway Grand Prix of Australia held at the Olympic Stadium in Sydney behind winner Greg Hancock and second placed Scott Nicholls.

Crump also won the 1999 Series 500 in Australia (also known as the Australian Masters Series). He was a regular competitor in the series which was run from 1995 to 2000. The Series 500 often saw top international riders such as World Champions Tony Rickardsson, Greg Hancock, Sam Ermolenko, Billy Hamill and multiple Long Track World Champion Simon Wigg competing against leading Australian riders Crump, Leigh Adams, Ryan Sullivan, Craig Boyce, Jason Lyons and Todd Wiltshire.

World Final Appearances

Individual World Championship
 1994 -  Vojens, Speedway Center - 11th - 6pts

World Team Cup
 1994 -  Brokstedt, Holsteinring Brokstedt (with Craig Boyce / Leigh Adams) - 4th - 17pts (0 - Did not ride)
 1995 -  Bydgoszcz, Polonia Bydgoszcz Stadium (with Craig Boyce / Leigh Adams) - 5th - 14pts (8)
 1999 -  Pardubice, Svítkova Stadion (with Leigh Adams / Ryan Sullivan / Jason Lyons / Todd Wiltshire) - Winner - 40pts (13)
 2000 -  Coventry, Brandon Stadium (with Leigh Adams / Ryan Sullivan / Todd Wiltshire / Craig Boyce) - 4th - 29pts (13)

World Cup
 2001 -  Wrocław, Olympic Stadium (with Leigh Adams / Todd Wiltshire / Craig Boyce / Ryan Sullivan) - Winner - 68pts (16)
 2002 -  Peterborough, East of England Showground (with Todd Wiltshire / Jason Lyons / Leigh Adams / Ryan Sullivan) - Winner - 64pts (17)
 2003 -  Vojens, Speedway Center (with Leigh Adams / Todd Wiltshire / Jason Lyons / Ryan Sullivan) - 2nd - 57pts (15)
 2006 -  Reading, Smallmead Stadium (with Travis McGowan / Ryan Sullivan / Todd Wiltshire / Leigh Adams) - 4th - 35pts (12)
 2007 -  Leszno, Alfred Smoczyk Stadium (with Ryan Sullivan / Leigh Adams / Chris Holder / Davey Watt / Rory Schlein) - 3rd - 29pts (9)
 2008 -  Vojens, Speedway Center (with Chris Holder / Leigh Adams / Ryan Sullivan / Davey Watt) - 4th - 21pts (3)
 2009 -  Leszno, Alfred Smoczyk Stadium (with Davey Watt / Troy Batchelor / Chris Holder / Leigh Adams) - 2nd - 43pts (12)
 2011 -  Gorzów Wielkopolski, Edward Jancarz Stadium (with Darcy Ward / Troy Batchelor / Davey Watt / Chris Holder) - 2nd - 51pts (13)
 2012 -  Målilla, G&B Stadium (with Darcy Ward / Davey Watt / Chris Holder) - 2nd - 36pts (10)

Individual Under-21 World Championship
 1993 -  Pardubice, Svítkova Stadion - 16th - 0pts (Did not ride)
 1994 -  Elgane, Elgane Speedway - 3rd - 12pts
 1995 -  Tampere, Ratinan stadion - Winner - 13+3pts

Speedway Grand Prix results

World Longtrack Championship

One Day Finals

 1993  Mühldorf (RNS)
 1994  Marianske Lazne (13th) 5pts
 1995  Scheeßel (7th) 17pts
 1996  Herxheim (9th) 8pts

Grand-Prix Appearance

2004 1 app (20th) 12pts

See also 
 Australia national speedway team
 List of Speedway Grand Prix riders

References

External links 
 Official Website
 Belle Vue Aces Fans Site
 http://grasstrackgb.co.uk/jason-crump/

1975 births
Living people
Australian speedway riders
Individual Speedway World Champions
Speedway World Cup champions
Belle Vue Aces riders
Peterborough Panthers riders
Plymouth Gladiators speedway riders
Poole Pirates riders
Swindon Robins riders
King's Lynn Stars riders
Oxford Cheetahs riders
Individual Speedway Long Track World Championship riders